Eshan Yi Autonomous County is located in Yuxi, in the central part of Yunnan Province, China.

Administrative divisions
Eshan Yi Autonomous County has 2 subdistricts, 3 towns and 3 townships. 
2 subdistricts
 Shuangjiang
 Xiaojie
3 towns
 Dianzhong
 Huanian
 Tadian
3 townships
 Chahe
 Dalongtan
 Fuliangpeng

Ethnic groups
The Eshan County Gazetteer (2001:110, 132) lists the following ethnic groups and their respective locations.

Yi: 71,255 people as of 1993
Nasu 纳苏: (West, Northwest) Fuliangpeng 富良棚, Dalongtan 大龙潭, Dianzhong 甸中, Tadian 塔甸, and Chahe 岔河; parts of Yani 亚尼
Niesu 聂苏: (East, Southeast, South 南) Jinping 锦屏, Xiaojie 小街, Baoquan 宝泉, Huanian 化念, and Gaoping 高平
Flowery Waist Niesu 聂苏花腰人: Pengzu 棚租 and Yulaiqiu 雨来救
Lesu 勒苏: Daxi 大西, Ana 婀娜, and Shiban 石板
Bai: 130 people as of 1993
Huanian 化念 (48.5% of population), Shuangjiang 双江, and Xiaojie 小街
Hani: 8,619 people as of 1993

Transport 
China National Highway 213
Yuxi–Mohan railway (u/c)

Climate

References

External links
Eshan County Official Website

County-level divisions of Yuxi
Yi autonomous counties